, born Satoshi Nakamura (also credited as Tatsu Nakamura and Tetu Nakamura), was a Japanese film actor and opera singer active from the 1940s to the 1980s. He featured in over 40 films.

Early years
Born in Vancouver, British Columbia, to a father involved in the lumber industry, Nakamura studied at Britannia Secondary School before enrolling at a music academy to become a baritone singer. After graduating, he performed on radio and in recitals before moving to Japan in 1940. There he enrolled in Nikkatsu's film acting school, and graduated in 1941. In the meantime, he was selected by the opera singer Yoshie Fujiwara to appear as Escamillo in Carmen in a performance at the Kabuki-za.

Career
He became a contract actor at the Toho Studios in 1942, and started appearing in roles in such films as The Opium War (1943), Ano hata o ute, and Aru yoru no tonosama (1946). After touring the United States as part of Fujiwara's opera company in 1953, he concentrated on film acting.

With his fluency in English, he often appeared in foreign co-productions. He played the antagonist in Tokyo File 212 (1951) and a supporting role in  Geisha Girl (1952). Writing about Tokyo File 212 in his book Korean War Filmography, Robert J. Lentz opined that "Nakamura [was] smooth and oily as the villain Oyama, who at heart [was] as much a capitalist as a Communist".

His other prominent roles include Dr. Robert Suzuki in George Breakston's science-fiction horror film The Manster (1962), Japanese Ambassador in the international co-production Red Sun (1971), Dr. Kawamoto in the B-movie The Last Dinosaur (1977) and other roles in Oriental Evil (1951), Futari no hitomi (1952), The H-Man (1958), Mothra (1961), The Lost World of Sinbad (1963) and Kokusai himitsu keisatsu: Kagi no kagi (1965).

He also appeared on television well into the 1980s.

Partial filmography

Ano hata o ute (1944)
Kôfuku eno shôtai (1947)
Koun no isu (1948)
Tokyo File 212 (1951) - Mr. Oyama
Oriental Evil (1951) - Noritomu Moriaji
Geisha Girl (1952) - Tetsu Nakano
Futari no hitomi (1952)
Senkan Yamato (1953)
Madame Butterfly (1954) - Yamadori
Tokyo da you okkasan (1957)
The Mysterians (1957) - Dr. Koda
The H-Man (1958) - Mr. Chin, gangster
Yaju shisubeshi (1959)
The Manster (1959) - Dr. Robert Suzuki
Wakai koibitotachi (1959) - Customer at Bar B
Kaoyaku to bakudan musume (1959)
Samurai to oneechan (1960) - Daisaku Tsubaki
Storm Over the Pacific (1960)
Gasu ningen dai 1 gô (1960) - Journalist
The Big Wave (1961) - Toru's Father
Honkon no yoru (1961)
Mothra (1961) - Nelson's Henchman
Attack Squadron! (1963)
Gojuman-nin no isan (1963) - Asian man
Interpol Códe 8 (1963) - Binh Hoa
The Lost World of Sinbad (1963) - Chief Archer
Atragon (1963) - Warship Captain
Kokusai himitsu keisatsu: Tora no kiba (1964) - Okada
Hi no ataru isu (1965)
Kokusai himitsu keisatsu: Kagi no kagi (1965) - Sritai
Kureji no daiboken (1965)
Nippon ichi no gorigan otoko (1966)
Kokusai himitsu keisatsu: Zettai zetsu (1967) - Head of ZZZ Hong Kong Branch Office
Latitude Zero (1969) - Dr. Okada
Space Amoeba (1970) - Chieftain Ombo
Red Sun (1971) - Japanese Ambassador
Tidal Wave (1973) - Philippines Ambassador to United Nations
Marco (1973) - Sea Captain
Karei-naru ichizoku (1974) - Shirakawa
Mastermind (1976) - Mr. Hiruta
The Last Dinosaur (1977) - Dr. Kawamoto (final film role)

References

External links

1909 births
1992 deaths
Japanese male film actors
Canadian male film actors
Canadian male actors of Japanese descent
Canadian emigrants to Japan
20th-century Japanese male opera singers
Male actors from Vancouver
Musicians from Vancouver